The Coordinating Committee for Multilateral Export Controls (CoCom) was established by the Western Bloc in the first five years  after the end of World War II, during the Cold War, to put an embargo on Comecon countries. CoCom ceased to function on March 31, 1994, and the then-current control list of embargoed goods was retained by the member nations until the successor, the Wassenaar Arrangement, was established in 1996.

Membership 
CoCom had 17 member states:

Laws and regulations 
In the United States, CoCom compliance was implemented in the 1960s via the Arms Export Control Act (AECA) and the State Department's regulatory supervision on AECA via International Traffic in Arms Regulations (ITAR), which are still in effect.

Violations

Toshiba Machine Company of Japan and Kongsberg Group of Norway supplied eight computer-guided propeller milling machines to the Soviet Union between 1982 and 1984, an action that violated the CoCom regulations. The United States' position is that this greatly improved the ability of Soviet submarines to evade detection. Congress moved to sanction Toshiba and ban imports of its products into the United States.

In a related case, French machine maker Forest Line exported several machines for fabricating fuselages for fighter planes and turbine blades for high-performance jet engines. This information came to light during an investigation by the Norwegian police into the Toshiba-Kongsberg scandal.

Legacy 
This was intended to prevent the use of GPS in intercontinental ballistic missile-like applications.

Some manufacturers apply this limit only when both speed and altitude limits are reached, while other manufacturers disable tracking when either limit is reached. In the latter case, this causes some devices to refuse to operate in very-high-altitude balloons.

See also
 Export control
 Multilateral export control regime
 International Traffic in Arms Regulations
 Arms Export Control Act
 Defense Security Cooperation Agency
 Export Administration Regulations
 John Barron KGB Today: The Hidden Hand, 1983.

References

Notes

 Mastanduno, M. (1992). Economic containment: CoCom and the politics of East-West trade. Cornell paperbacks. Cornell University Press, Ithaca, N.Y. 
 Noehrenberg, E. H. (1995). Multilateral export controls and international regime theory: the effectiveness of COCOM. Pro Universitate.
 Yasuhara, Y. (1991). The myth of free trade: the origins of COCOM 1945-1950. The Japanese Journal of American Studies, 4.

Export and import control
History of international trade
Arms control
1994 disestablishments
Foreign relations of the Soviet Union
Soviet Union–United States relations
Embargoes
Cold War
Foreign trade of the Soviet Union
Sanctions against Russia